Oliver McCall vs. Larry Holmes, billed as "Burden of Proof", was a professional boxing match contested on April 8, 1995 for the WBC Heavyweight Championship. The undercard included world championship bouts in four other categories.

Background
After Oliver McCall stunned Lennox Lewis in the second round to become WBC Heavyweight Champion, he turned down a $10 million offer from Lewis for an immediate rematch. Instead he agreed to fight 46 year old former WBC, IBF and lineal heavyweight champion Larry Holmes, who was making his fourth attempt at regaining a heavyweight title after losing to Michael Spinks in 1985. Each of his previous three attempts (against Spinks in 1986 in a rematch, against Mike Tyson in 1988, and against Evander Holyfield in 1992) ended in defeat, although he went the distance in two of the three fights.

The fight
For most of the 12 rounds Holmes was often hanging on the ropes, allowing McCall to open a flurry, before countering with quick rights. McCall tried to jab with Holmes throwing right leads and connecting with McCall's chin.

In the ninth round a McCall left barreled Holmes backward into the ropes, which were the only thing that kept him from falling. From then on, McCall dominated the fight. There were no knockdowns, but McCall gave Holmes a severe gash on his left cheekbone.

Judges Barbara Perez and Tomi Tomihari gave the fight to McCall 115-114 and Chuck Giampa called it 115-112.

Undercard
In addition to the main event title fight, four other world championship bouts were contested that evening.

The first bout of the televised portion of the card was between Bruce Seldon and former IBF champion Tony Tucker for the WBA heavyweight title that had been stripped from George Foreman after he refused to fight top contender Tucker. Seldon earned the victory after the ringside physician told referee Mills Lane that Tucker could not continue following the seventh round due to a fractured eye socket.

In the next fight, IBF welterweight champion Félix Trinidad made the sixth defense of his championship he had held since 1993 against Roger Turner. Trinidad made quick work of Turner, knocking him out in the second round to run his record to 26-0.

Julio César Chávez faced Giovanni Parisi in the third defense of his WBC and lineal junior welterweight championships that he had won back from Frankie Randall in June 1994 to avenge what was, to that point in his career, his only defeat. Chavez won a lopsided unanimous decision to win his 93rd career fight.

The final match before the main event was a rematch for the WBC super welterweight crown, in which former champion Terry Norris looked to regain the championship he lost to Luis Santana under controversial circumstances in November 1994. However, as he had been in that fight, Norris was disqualified. This time, he hit Santana after the bell and referee Kenny Bayless awarded the fight to Santana.

Aftermath
Oliver McCall's next bout was against British veteran Frank Bruno, who defeated him later in 1995 to win the title. Bruno in turn would immediately lose the title in his first defense against Mike Tyson, whom the winner of the fight was contractually obligated to face.

Bruce Seldon would make one successful defense of his WBA title, defeating Joe Hipp by TKO in the tenth round on the undercard of Tyson's comeback fight event. In his next fight after that, he defended the title against Tyson, who knocked him out in the first round.

Félix Trinidad would hold onto the IBF welterweight championship until 1999, making a total of fourteen successful defenses. After winning the WBC and lineal championships from Oscar De La Hoya that year, he moved up in weight and by 2001 had also won titles at junior middleweight and middleweight. 

Julio César Chávez would make one more sanctioned defense of his WBC and lineal super lightweight titles before losing them to De La Hoya by knockout in June 1996, the first time in his career he had been stopped. He continued fighting until 2005, finishing with a career record of 107 wins, 6 losses, and 2 draws. 

Terry Norris and Luis Santana fought for a third time on the Tyson comeback undercard, and this time there was a definitive winner as Norris knocked Santana out in the second round to regain the WBC super welterweight title. Norris then added the IBF championship and the lineal championship to his resume by beating Paul Vaden in his next fight. He would hold those titles until 1997.

Undercard
Confirmed bouts:

Broadcasting

References

1995 in boxing
Boxing in Las Vegas
1995 in sports in Nevada
World Boxing Council heavyweight championship matches
April 1995 sports events in the United States
Caesars Palace